Raymond Deane (born 27 January 1953) is an Irish composer and co-founder of the Ireland-Palestine Solidarity Campaign.

Biography
Deane was born in Tuam, County Galway and brought up on Achill Island, County Mayo. From 1963 he lived in Dublin, where initially he studied the piano at the then College of Music with Fionn Ó Lochlainn. He studied at University College Dublin, graduating in 1974, and became a founding member of the Association of Young Irish Composers, a predecessor of today's Association of Irish Composers. He won a number of awards as a pianist. In 1974, Deane won a scholarship to study with Gerald Bennett at the Musikakademie in Basle, Switzerland. He moved on to Cologne as a student of Mauricio Kagel but was persuaded to change to studying with Karlheinz Stockhausen, which Deane abandoned after six months "due to Stockhausen's lack of engagement with his students at this period". With a DAAD scholarship, Deane continued his studies with Isang Yun in Berlin.

In the 1991 Accents Festival in Dublin, he was the featured composer (with Kurtág), also at the 1999 Sligo New Music Festival (with Roger Doyle). He represented Ireland in several ISCM festivals (Mexico City, Manchester, Hong Kong), and works were performed at the festivals l'Imaginaire irlandais (Paris 1996), Voyages (Montreal 2002), Warsaw Autumn (2004), and more than once at the UNESCO International Rostrum of Composers (his Ripieno for orchestra winning a special prize in 2000). He was also the artistic director of the first two RTÉ Living Music Festivals (Dublin 2002 and 2004), showcasing the music of Luciano Berio and contemporary French music respectively. In 2010, a portrait concert of his chamber music took place at the Southbank Centre, London.

Deane was awarded a Doctorate in Composition by Maynooth University in 2005. He has been a member of Aosdána, the Irish state-supported academy of creative artists, since 1986.

Besides his music, Raymond Deane is known for his social commitment and human rights activism, particularly for the Ireland–Palestine Solidarity Campaign, which he co-founded in 2001, and the Irish Anti-War Movement. He cited early experiences of bullying in his childhood as a potential cause of this commitment: "[...] I have internalised the certainty that this bullying was a defining factor in my personal growth, eventually leading to my sporadic activism on behalf of the downtrodden".

Deane has always been active as a writer of essays and critic on music, having published in Irish journals such as "In Dublin", "Soundpost", the "Journal of Music in Ireland" and in some academic books. In 1991, he published a mock-Gothic novel called Death of a Medium. He also wrote an autobiography, covering the years up to about 1987, which was published in 2014 (see Bibliography).

Since 2022, Deane's music is published by Universal Edition, with his earlier pieces gradually being added to the catalogue.

Music
Raymond Deane is "one of the most prominent figures in contemporary Irish composition". His work can be divided into three phases, one ending in 1974 before his studies abroad, the second ending in 1988 – a period he described as "a process of learning, assimilating and overcoming that assimilation – and the period since then, which has been described as a "re-gathering" Several works of his middle phase are consciously constructed in a technical manner to avoid the trend towards neo-romanticism that he perceived among many of his contemporaries. According to Fitzgerald, "Deane strives to achieve a dialectical drama without regressing to nineteenth-century norms of developmentalism. The result is a heterogeneous and impure dramatic discourse." Zuk wrote, "Even at first hearing, it is evident that his work is a product of a highly reflective mind, being for the most part intensely serious in tone, though shot through at times with an idiosyncratic humour and on other occasions pervaded by a distinct spirit of playfulness".

Selected works
The following list is based on Zuk (2006; see Bibliography), p. 121-5; more recent ones from CMC profile (see External links).

Operas
 The Poet and His Double (libretto: Raymond Deane; 1991)
 The Wall of Cloud (R. Deane; 1997)
 The Alma Fetish (Gavin Kostick; 2012)
 Vagabones (Renate Debrun after Emma Donoghue's radio play Trespasses; 2019)

Orchestral (for large orchestra, if not otherwise mentioned)
 Embers (1973) for string orchestra
 Enchaînement (1982)
 de/montage (1984)
 Thresholds (1987, rev. 1991)
 Quaternion (1988) for piano and orchestra
 Krespel's Concerto (1990) for violin and orchestra
 Catenae (1991)
 Oboe Concerto (1994)
 Dekatriad (1995)
 Five Piece Suite (1999) for string orchestra
 Ripieno (1999)
 Violin Concerto (2003)
 Concursus (2004) for violin, viola and string orchestra
 Samara (2005)
 Hungarian Jewish Melodies (2007) for violin, viola, cello and string orchestra
 A Baroque Session (with Carolan and Friends) (2009) for violin, viola, cello and string orchestra

Chamber music
 Embers (1973) for string quartet
 Lichtzwang (1979) for cello and piano
 Aprèsludes (1979) for flute, cello, clarinet, percussion, harp, viola, cello
 String Quartet I: Silhouettes (1981)
 Seachanges (1993) for piccolo, violin, cello, piano and percussion
 Catacombs (1994, rev. 2004) for clarinet, violin, cello, piano
 Moresque (1996) for oboe and percussion
 Marche oublié (1996, rev. 2004) for violin, cello, piano
 String Quartet II: Brown Studies (1998)
 Parthenia Violata (1998) for violin and piano
 Pentacle (2000) for violin and cello
 String Quartet III: Inter pares (2000)
 String Quartet IV: Equali (2001)
 Brève for viola solo (2003)
 Marthiya (2004) for violin, viola, cello

 Venthalia (2007) for flute/alto-fl/piccolo and piano
 Quadripartita (2012) for violin, viola, cello, double bass
 Danse de la terre (2013) for violin, viola, cello
 String Quartet V: Siberia (2013)
 String Quartet VI (2016)
 Scintillae II: Seven Fragments from a Pandemic (2021) for violin and piano

Piano
 Orphica (1970, rev. 1981, 1996)
 Linoi (1973, rev. 1984)
 Piano Sonata No. 1 (1974, rev. 1980)
 Triarchia (1978, rev. 1981)
 Piano Sonata No. 2 (1981)
 Avatars (1982)
 Contretemps (1989) for 2 pianos
 After-Pieces (1990)
 Rahu's Rounds (1998)
 Siris (2006)
 Noctuary (2011)
 Legerdemain (2013)
 Tapestry XIII: The Walling of Ros (2016)
 Raccordement: In memoriam Claude Debussy (2017)
 Scintillae (2021)

Vocal
 Tristia (Emily Dickinson, Paul Celan, Thomas Hardy) (1980) for soprano and ensemble
 Archair (Máirtín Ó Direáin) (1987) for soprano and ensemble
 ... e mi sovvien l'eterno ... (Giacomo Leopardi) (1987) for mixed choir
 November Songs (Patrick Kavanagh) (1990) for mezzo and ensemble
 ... una musica riposa (Mario Luzi) for mezzo, oboe, cello, piano
 Two Songs for Paris (Kevin Hart, Emmanuel Moses) (1995) for mezzo, viola and piano
 So Quiet Now ... (Kevin Hart) (1996) for soprano, viola and piano
 Voices, Receding (Two Songs against War) (Isaac Rosenberg, Wilfred Owen) (2015) for soprano and piano
 Galar an ghrá/The Disease of Love (Maghnus Ó Domhnaill) (2019) for low voice and piano
 5 Roses in 4 Parts (2021) for mixed choir

Novel
 Death of a Medium (Dublin: Odell & Adair, 1991)

Recordings
Based on Klein (2001), with more recent additions, see external links.
 Avatars, Jimmy Vaughan (piano), on: Goasco GXX003-4 (MC, 1985).
 Dekatriad, Irish Chamber Orchestra, Fionnuala Hunt (cond.), on: Black Box Music BBM 1013 (CD, 1998).
 Quaternion (with Anthony Byrne, piano), Krespel's Concerto (with Alan Smale, violin), Oboe Concerto (with Matthew Manning, oboe), National Symphony Orchestra of Ireland, Colman Pearce (cond.), on: Marco Polo 8.225106 (CD, 1999).
 After-Pieces (with Hugh Tinney, piano), Seachanges (with Danse macabre) and Catacombs (perf. by Ensemble Reservoir, Mikel Toms, cond.), Marche oublié (perf. by Schubert Ensemble of London), String Quartet II: Brown Studies (Vanbrugh Quartet) on: Black Box Music BBM 1014 (CD, 2000).
 Ripieno, Violin Concerto (with Christine Pryn, violin), Samara, RTÉ National Symphony Orchestra, Gerhard Markson (cond.), on: RTÉ CD 274 (CD, 2007).
 Apostille, David Adams (organ), on: Irish Contemporary Organ Music (no label) (CD, 2008).
 Five Piece Suite, Young European Strings Chamber Orchestra, Ronald Masin (cond.), on: Third Edition (no label) (CD, 2011).
 Noctuary Books I and II (= complete), Hugh Tinney (piano), on: Resonus Classics RD CD 01 (CD, 2014) and Resonus Classics RES 10133 (download only, published 2014).
 Embers (orchestral version), performed by RTÉ National Symphony Orchestra, Gerhard Markson (cond.), on: RTÉ lyric fm CD 153 (CD, 2016).
 Embers (string quartet version); Marthiya, performed by Carducci Quartet und Crash Ensemble, on Louth Contemporary Music CGL LCMS 2021 (CD, 2021).

Bibliography
Axel Klein: Die Musik Irlands im 20. Jahrhundert (Hildesheim: Georg Olms, 1996), .
Patrick Zuk: Raymond Deane (Dublin: Field Day Publications, 2006), .
Mark Fitzgerald: "Deane, Raymond", in: The Encyclopaedia of Music in Ireland, ed. by Harry White and Barra Boydell (Dublin: UCD Press, 2013), p. 289–291.
Raymond Deane: In My Own Light. A Memoir (Dublin: Liffey Press, 2014), .
Axel Klein: "Selbstfindung durch Musik. Der irische Komponist Raymond Deane", in: Neue Zeitschrift für Musik vol. 176 (2015) no. 4 (July/August), p. 48–50 [in German].

References

External links
 Official website
 Profile at Contemporary Music Centre, Dublin
 Soundcloud channel
 YouTube channel
 Publisher's information (Universal Edition)
 17 Minute film by Mark Linnane A Portrait of Raymond Deane (2013)

1953 births
20th-century classical composers
20th-century male musicians
21st-century classical composers
21st-century male musicians
Alumni of Maynooth University
Alumni of University College Dublin
Aosdána members
Irish classical composers
Irish male classical composers
Irish opera composers
Male opera composers
Living people
Modernist composers
Musicians from County Mayo
Musicians from County Galway
Pupils of Karlheinz Stockhausen